The Fat Boys were an American hip hop trio from Brooklyn, New York, who emerged in the early 1980s. The group was briefly known originally as the Disco 3, originally composed of Mark "Prince Markie Dee" Morales, Damon "Kool Rock-Ski" Wimbley, and Darren "Buff Love" Robinson.

The trio is widely known for using beatbox in their songs. The group opened doors for beatboxers like Biz Markie and Doug E. Fresh. The Fat Boys were one of the first rap groups to release full-length rap albums, along with Run-D.M.C., Whodini and Kurtis Blow. Beloved for their comedic, self-deprecating rhymes, the group released seven studio albums, four of which went Gold by RIAA.

The first two albums of the group were produced by  Kurtis Blow. Successful singles included "Jail House Rap", "Can You Feel It?", "Fat Boys", "Stick 'Em", "Don't You Dog Me", "All You Can Eat", "The Fat Boys Are Back", and "Pump It Up".

The album Crushin' received a Platinum status due to their single "Wipeout", which was recorded together with the American rock group The Beach Boys. The next album, Coming Back Hard Again, repeated the formula of the previous one and received a Gold status due to the successful single "The Twist (Yo, Twist)", recorded together with American rock 'n roll singer Chubby Checker. The album also included the theme song for the movie A Nightmare on Elm Street 4: The Dream Master, which featured Robert Englund performing as Freddy Krueger.

The group starred in three feature films in the 1980s: Krush Groove, Knights of the City and Disorderlies.

Members
Mark Morales, also known as "Prince Markie Dee" (February 19, 1968 – February 18, 2021) 
Damon Wimbley, also known as "Kool Rock-Ski" (born November 9, 1966)
Darren Robinson, also known as "The Human Beat Box" and "Buff Love" (June 10, 1967 – December 10, 1995)

History

Beginnings
In 1983, a Swiss-born promoter named Charles Stettler, the owner of his own label Tin Pan Apple, decided to hold a hip-hop talent contest. To find a sponsor, Stettler went to the WBLS radio station, which recommended him to a couple of sponsors. In the end, he persuaded the company Coca-Cola to finance the contest. For the next three months, contests were held to identify a winner in each borough of New York City every Saturday afternoon.

On May 23, 1983, the final contest entitled "Coca-Cola and WBLS present: The Tin Pan Apple After Dark Dance & Rap Contest!" was held. The event was held at Radio City Music Hall. The host that evening was Mr. Magic from the radio program Rap Attack. According to the terms of the competition, the winner signed a contract for a recording contract. The Fat Boys members, then calling themselves The Disco 3, were unexpected winners with their song "Stick' Em".

European Tour 
In 1983, The Disco 3 released their debut single "Reality". It was produced by James Mason, jazz guitarist and keyboardist of Roy Ayers' jazz-funk band.

Since the group did not have a manager, Stettler took over this position. Stettler took the group on a European bus tour, where he told them to gain more weight. The concerts ended at 12 o'clock in the evening, and they could not get to the hotel until two o'clock in the morning. Only places like McDonald's and Burger King were open, so the group members gained weight from this. Since so much was happening, the group members did not even notice this on the tour and did not consider themselves overweight.  A party was later held for the renaming of the group at the Roseland Ballroom in New York.

Meeting Kurtis Blow 
Charlie Stettler introduced the group to rapper and producer Kurtis Blow, who helped them find their signature sound. To work on the album, Kurtis Blow recruited the drum machine programmers of Run-D.M.C., Larry Smith and Davy "DMX" Reeves, who were considered two of the best at making songs at the time. "Stick' Em" was the first song they recorded with Kurtis Blow.

The group's 1984 self-titled debut album, Fat Boys, is considered by many to be the first hip-hop album to feature the element of hip hop known as beatboxing. Darren "The Human Beat Box" Robinson was a pioneer in beatboxing.

Fresh Fest Tour '84 
One day in 1984, Russell Simmons stormed into Stettler's office and told him that he was going to have a festival titled Fresh Fest Tour '84, in which his groups and breakdancers would take part. Since Stettler raised $300,000 from Coca-Cola to finance his 1983 contest, Simmons wanted Stettler to do it again. The young promoter could not get the beverage company to return, so he called a friend of his and asked him if there was anything the Swiss were trying to sell. The Swatch wristwatch turned out to be such a product. Stettler persuaded the company to finance a tour of $360,000, while the festival was renamed The Swatch Watch New York City Fresh Fest.

Russell Simmons did not want to take the Fat Boys on the tour, because nobody had heard of them at that point. Stettler went to an old Tower Records store on 4th Street and Broadway, and handed out 5,000 flyers that read: "Guess the weight of the Fat Boys and the person who does wins 800 cans of Diet Pepsi and one dollar." Thousands of children lined up at the Tower Records store to participate. Stettler put the group members on the scale; at that time they weighed  together. In the end, a boy from Harlem won. Channel 2 News filmed this event, including the delivery of the soft drink, but police did not respond when it was stolen a short time later.

The next day, Stettler saw in the newspaper that The Jackson 5 was going to be reuniting at a concert in October 1984. He called his wife and part-time partner, asking her to write a press release saying that the Jackson 5 have picked the then-still-unknown group the Fat Boys as their opening act. Stettler distributed this press release across the city. The next morning, Stettler and The Fat Boys appeared on the TV show Good Morning America. When the host turned around to The Fat Boys, they did not know what to say. They simply said: "Brrr, Stick' Em! Ha-ha-ha, Stick 'Em!", due to it being the group's popular song at the time.

Russell Simmons agreed to add The Fat Boys to the lineup of the festival, which included Run-D.M.C., Kurtis Blow, Whodini, Newcleus, and The Dynamic Breakers. The first concert of the tour took place on Labor Day, September 3, 1984. For 27 concerts in the United States, the organizers raised $3.5 million. The festival was accompanied by advertising on television.

In 1985, this was followed by Fresh Fest II, which included the same acts, with Grandmaster Flash and the Furious Five replacing Newcleus.

Film and television
At the time, the American office of the company Swatch was tasked with trying to advertise its product to American audiences. The company was known for using offbeat campaigns, and agreed to feature the Fat Boys in a commercial for the watches on MTV. The video "Brrr, Swatch ’Em!" was aired in December 1984. Swatch again featured The Fat Boys in a 1985 Christmas advertisement created by former MTV creative heads Alan Goodman and Fred Seibert. This commercial, "Swatch Watch Presents A Merry Christmas" was first broadcast in December 1985. These commercials were notable, because when they aired in December 1984, MTV did not feature many hip-hop artists in their programming, having only started airing music videos from rap artists earlier that year with Run-D.M.C.’s crossover hit, “Rock Box.” Due to the success of these commercials, they would become frequent guests on MTV, pioneering a space for hip-hop artists to appear on the network and ultimately increasing hip hop's popularity and legitimacy with MTV's audience. 

Also because of these commercials, the group developed a reputation for their sense of humor. They starred in several feature films. Their first starring role came in the movie Krush Groove (1985), followed by a second, Disorderlies (1987), which also featured Ralph Bellamy as a millionaire invalid cared for by his good-natured yet inept orderlies (played by the Fat Boys), with a cameo by manager Stettler.

Making Crushin and Coming Back Hard Again 
Hoping to repeat the success of Run-D.M.C. and Aerosmith with the single "Walk This Way" The Fat Boys made a cover version of the song "Wipeout" together with rock group The Beach Boys. The single peaked at number 12 on the Billboard Hot 100 and number 10 on the Hot R&B/Hip-Hop Songs. The song "Wipeout" reached #2 on UK Top 100 in September 1987 during a 13-week chart run. "Wipeout" was the last song the group members recorded for the album Crushin'".

The music video for the song begins with an announcement of a boxing match, The Fat Boys and The Beach Boys are attending the match. The match is interrupted by a fight. In the following scene, The Fat Boys load up a car with swimsuits and then drive off. The Beach Boys are driving in a dune buggy through the city. Both bands go around the city in the direction of a beach, while they perform the song and invite the inhabitants of the city to come to the beach. Meanwhile, at the beach one of The Fat Boys tries to lift a heavy weight and is laughed at by two women because of failure, another playing volleyball and another surfing. The Beach Boys on the other hand are DJing in the street. At the end of the video they all celebrate at a beach party.

The group was later approached to record the theme song for A Nightmare on Elm Street 4: The Dream Master (1988), called "Are You Ready for Freddy", which featured Robert Englund performing as Freddy Krueger.

Their next album called Coming Back Hard Again repeated the formula of the previous one. This time, The Fat Boys recorded a cover version of the song "The Twist" with Chubby Checker, who performed it originally in 1960. The single peaked at number 16 on the Billboard Hot 100 and number 40 on the Hot R&B/Hip-Hop Songs. The song "The Twist (Yo, Twist)" reached number two on UK Top 100 in July 1988 during a 11-week chart run. Another song from the album, "Louie Louie", is a cover version of a 1957 song by American singer Richard Berry. The song peaked at number 46 on UK Top 100 on November 5, 1988 for 4 weeks.

 Breakup 
However, the tastes of the listeners at that time had already changed. By taking part in the rash rap opera On And On, the group tried to regain its fame, but this only accelerated the breakup of the group. Prince Markie Dee left the group in 1990 to pursue solo interests, which included producing many early tracks for Mariah Carey and Mary J. Blige which included her debut single, "Real Love". In 1991, the remaining two members, Kool Rock-Ski and Buff Love, carried on as a duo and released Mack Daddy (1991), but shortly thereafter, the group disbanded (until 2008). In the 1992 feature film Boomerang, Chris Rock's character laments the breakup of the Fat Boys. He was later quoted by Jay-Z in his 2001 song the "Heart of the City (Ain't No Love)".

 Aftermath 
On December 10, 1995, Buff Love died of a heart attack during a bout with respiratory flu in Rosedale, Queens, New York.

The surviving members of the Fat Boys launched its first official homepage, OriginalFatBoys.com, on November 5, 2008. According to the website, the Fat Boys recorded their first track in nearly two decades and had plans of doing a reality TV show in search of a new member.

In March 2009, Kool Rock-Ski announced the launch of his official website, KoolRockSki.com. His first solo project, the EP Party Time, was released on April 14, 2009.

On October 18, 2010, the cable network TV One's aired Unsung: The Story of The Fat Boys. It mentioned that the two surviving members reunited and were touring with Doug E. Fresh who was providing the beatboxing. There has been no confirmation as to whether he is the new third permanent member. The special was produced by the group's manager, Louis Gregory, publicly known as Uncle Louie.

In August 2012, The Fat Boys were scheduled to perform at the 13th annual Gathering of the Juggalos in Cave-In-Rock, Illinois but ultimately failed to appear.

Prince Markie Dee died of a suspected heart attack on February 18, 2021, the day before his 53rd birthday; according to TMZ, Morales had gone to the hospital complaining of chest pains. It was determined a stent was needed to clear blockage in his heart, but Morales died before the stent could be inserted.

Prince Markie Dee was a radio host for WEDR 99 Jamz in Miami, Florida working weekends while Kool Rock-Ski is last known to have been residing in New York, and is the last surviving Fat Boy.

Discography
Albums

 Singles 

 Filmography 
 Feature films 
1985 – Krush Groove (October 25, 1985)
1986 – Knights of the City (February 14, 1986)
1987 – Disorderlies (August 14, 1987)

 Documentary 
2000 – Where Are They Now?: The 80s II (by VH-1) (September 28, 2000)
2002 – Breath Control: The History of the Human Beat Box (Tribeca Film Festival 2002) (May 9, 2002)
2004 – And You Don't Stop: 30 Years of Hip-Hop (October 4, 2004)
2010 – Unsung: The Story of The Fat Boys (by TV One) (October 18, 2010)
2010 – Never Sleep Again: The Elm Street Legacy (DVD) (May 4, 2010)
2011 – Beatboxing - The Fifth Element of Hip Hop (Atlanta Film Festival, May 5, 2011)

 Video compilations 
1986 - Brrr, Watch 'Em! (MCA Home Video)		
1988 - 3×3'' (PolyGram Music Video)

References

External links

 
 
 

American hip hop groups
American musical trios
American beatboxers
Polydor Records artists
Kama Sutra Records artists
Musical groups established in 1983
Musical groups disestablished in 1991
Musical groups from Brooklyn
Musical groups reestablished in 2008
Musical groups disestablished in 2021
1983 establishments in New York City
2021 disestablishments in New York (state)